New Video (stylized as NEWVIDEO) is an American entertainment distributor and collector of independent digital content. The company works with independent producers, filmmakers and television networks to curate content for many types of distribution platforms, including digital, cable, video on demand, Blu-ray, DVD, and theatrical releases.

Until 2012, New Video was marketing and distributing television series and films for A&E Home Entertainment, which included A&E, History channel, and Lifetime. New Video's library includes Major League Baseball games, films from Tribeca Film and storybook content from Scholastic and Weston Woods. New Video also distributed films for Arthouse Films, and Plexifilm.

History

In 2011, New Video partnered with China Lion to distribute Chinese-language films across North America via various platforms. New Video was named as the exclusive aggregation partner to digital platforms for the Sundance Institute's Artist Services Initiative.

Co-presidents of New Video, Susan Margolin and Steve Savage, received the 2011 Digital 25 Award by the Producers Guild of America and Variety. The award recognizes individuals who have contributed to the advancement of digital entertainment and storytelling.

New Video was purchased by Cinedigm in early 2012.

In 2013, New Video purchased Gaiam Vivendi Entertainment, and became the successor to GoodTimes Entertainment.

Services

New Video Digital is the world's largest independent digital video distributor. It provides over 10,000 hours of film and television to download and to streaming platforms, such as iTunes, Netflix, and Hulu.

Select releases

The following select releases were 44 years apart in total from 1967 to 2011.

Divisions

Docurama Films is a distributor of home video documentaries and has expanded to digital and theatrical platforms. In 2009, Docurama Films celebrated its tenth anniversary by screening special series at the IFC Center in New York City.

Select Docurama Films releases include:

The Atomic Cafe (1982)
Best Boy (1979)
Blue Vinyl (2002)
Bob Dylan: Don't Look Back (1967)
Gasland (2010)
Genghis Blues (1999)
Hell and Back Again (2011)
Hot Coffee(2011)
The Last Mountain (2011)
Lost Boys of Sudan (2003)
Southern Comfort (2001)
The Weather Underground (2002)
The Wild Parrots of Telegraph Hill (2005)

Flatiron Film Company is a distributor of next-generation Indian and foreign films, as well as web titles from Mondo Media, such as Happy Tree Friends. Flatiron distributed Mondo's first feature-length animated film, Dick Figures: The Movie. The company also handles US theatrical distribution for Elite Squad: The Enemy Within, Brazil's highest-grossing film.

Select Flatiron Film Company releases include:

Digimon
Dr. Horrible's Sing-Along Blog (2008)
The Guild (Season 1–4)
Red vs. Blue (Season 1–16)
RWBY (Volume 1–6)
The Secret of Kells (2009)
Yu-Gi-Oh!

References

External links
 Official website

1991 establishments in New York (state)
American companies established in 1991
Mass media companies established in 1991
Entertainment companies of the United States
Film distributors of the United States
Television syndication distributors
2012 mergers and acquisitions
Home video companies of the United States
Cinedigm